Aerosolization is the process or act of converting some physical substance into the form of particles small and light enough to be carried on the air i.e. into an aerosol. Aerosolization refers to a process of intentionally oxidatively converting and suspending particles or a composition in a moving stream of air for the purpose of delivering the oxidized particles or composition to a particular location.

The term is often used in medicine to refer specifically to the production of airborne particles (e.g. tiny liquid droplets) containing infectious virus or bacteria. The infectious organism is said to be aerosolized. This can occur when an infected individual coughs, sneezes exhales, or vomits, but can also arise from flushing a toilet, or disturbing dried contaminated feces.

Treatment of some respiratory diseases relies on aerosolization of a liquid medication using a nebulizer, which is then breathed in for direct transport to the lungs.

In the context of chemical and biological weapons, aerosolization is a means of dispersing a chemical or biological agent in an attack. See for example "Botulinum Toxin as a Biological Weapon".

Aerosolization and dustiness 
Dustiness is defined as the tendency of a powder material to generate airborne particles under a given external energy input. This property of powdered materials has a close link with powder aerosolization processes. It also has indications on human exposure level and associated health risks at workplaces. Dusty materials tend to produce aerosols with high number concentrations, which poses higher exposure risks to the workers who are in direct contacts with them during industrial production and handling processes. Laboratory simulations have been established to test aerosolization behavior and dustiness level of powders, in order to predict aerosol properties encountered in real-life situations.

References 

Aerosols